FC Bunyodkor-2 (Uzbek Cyrillic: Бунёдкор-2) is an Uzbek football club based in Tashkent, Uzbekistan. Bunyodkor-2 is the farm club of FC Bunyodkor. Currently club plays in First League.

History
Bunyodkor-2 was formed in 2009. The club used to be made up of players from the youth teams and football academy of Bunyodkor. Bunyodkor-2 is feeder team of Bunyodkor. Club plays in First League and participates in Uzbek Cup. In March 2014 after Sergey Lushan left the club Vadim Shodimatov was appointed as the new head.

Managers
 Dmitriy Kim (2011–2013)
 Sergey Lushan (2013–2014)
 Vadim Shodimatov (2014–)

References

External links
 FC Bunyodkor official website
 Bunyodkor-2 squad

Football clubs in Uzbekistan
2009 establishments in Uzbekistan
Association football clubs established in 2009